The lemon-rumped warbler or pale-rumped warbler (Phylloscopus chloronotus) is a species of Old World warbler in the family Phylloscopidae. It is found from the western Himalayas to central China.

References

lemon-rumped warbler
Birds of the Himalayas
lemon-rumped warbler
lemon-rumped warbler
lemon-rumped warbler